Agata Ewa Wróbel (born August 28, 1981, in Żywiec) is a Polish weightlifter, and is a world record-breaker in the +75 kg category.

She took up weightlifting after watching the men compete in the 1996 Summer Olympics in Atlanta, and after learning that women's weightlifting would be an event at the 2000 Summer Olympics in Sydney.

At the 2000 World Junior Championships her combined total for both the snatch and clean and jerk was a record-breaking 290 kg. She has broken no fewer than 11 world records in the sport. In 2002, she was voted 2nd for world weightlifter of the year.

As well as numerous Junior and World Championship successes, coming first in 2002, she has participated in both the 2000 Summer Olympics and 2004 Summer Olympics in the Women's +75 kg category, winning a silver medal and a bronze medal respectively.

In 2003, she appeared in the [French] documentary "M2A – Mission to Athens", depicting her preparation to the 2004 Summer Olympics in Athens.

After retirement from the sport, she worked in a waste sorting facility.

For her sport achievements, she received:

 Golden Cross of Merit in 2000; 
 Knight's Cross of the Order of Polonia Restituta (5th Class) in 2004.

References

External links
 
 
 
 
 

1981 births
Living people
Polish female weightlifters
Weightlifters at the 2000 Summer Olympics
Weightlifters at the 2004 Summer Olympics
Olympic weightlifters of Poland
Olympic silver medalists for Poland
Olympic bronze medalists for Poland
People from Żywiec
Olympic medalists in weightlifting
Knights of the Order of Polonia Restituta
Recipients of the Gold Cross of Merit (Poland)
Medalists at the 2004 Summer Olympics
Sportspeople from Silesian Voivodeship
Medalists at the 2000 Summer Olympics
European Weightlifting Championships medalists
World Weightlifting Championships medalists
21st-century Polish women